Lobb's Cemetery, a.k.a. Lobb's Run Cemetery, is a historic cemetery in Allegheny County, Pennsylvania. It takes its name from Lobb's Run, a minor tributary of the Monongahela River, which flows by the entrance to the cemetery.

The former Yohogania County Courthouse was once located close to this cemetery, and some of the rebels involved in the Whiskey Rebellion were buried in this cemetery around 1794.

The site was listed on the National Register of Historic Places in 1992.

See also
 National Register of Historic Places listings in Allegheny County, Pennsylvania

References

External links
 

Cemeteries on the National Register of Historic Places in Pennsylvania
Cemeteries in Allegheny County, Pennsylvania
National Register of Historic Places in Allegheny County, Pennsylvania